Pennask Creek Provincial Park is a provincial park in British Columbia, Canada. It is located on highway 97C about 50 kilometres west of Kelowna.

It was established on April 18, 2001 to protect a significant rainbow trout brood fishery. The park also contains mature forests of Lodgepole pine with some Engelmann spruce and other species of flora. It is not intended for public use except for viewing of fish spawning and other educational programs.

References
BCParks: Pennask Creek Provincial Park accessed 11 February 2010

External links

Provincial parks of British Columbia
Nicola Country
2001 establishments in British Columbia
Protected areas established in 2001